Darier's sign is a change observed after stroking lesions on the skin of a person with systemic mastocytosis or urticaria pigmentosa. 

In general, the skin becomes swollen, itchy and red. This is a result of compression of mast cells, which are hyperactive in these diseases. These mast cells release inflammatory granules which contain histamine. It is the histamine which is responsible for the response seen after rubbing the lesional skin.

Eponym
Darier's sign is named after the French dermatologist Ferdinand-Jean Darier (1856–1938) who first described it.

See also
 Dermatographic urticaria

References

Dermatologic signs